The men's 400 metre freestyle event at the 2010 Asian Games took place on 16 November 2010 at Guangzhou Aoti Aquatics Centre.

There were 26 competitors from 15 countries who took part in this event. Four heats were held. The heat in which a swimmer competed did not formally matter for advancement, as the swimmers with the top eight times from the entire field qualified for the finals.

Defending champion Park Tae-hwan from South Korea won the gold medal with 3 minutes 41.53 seconds, Sun Yang from China finished with second place, Asian record holder Zhang Lin won the bronze medal.

Schedule
All times are China Standard Time (UTC+08:00)

Records

Results

Heats

Final

References
 16th Asian Games Results

External links 
 Men's 400m Freestyle Heats Official Website
 Men's 400m Freestyle Ev.No.22 Final Official Website

Swimming at the 2010 Asian Games